Shahriari-ye Olya (also Romanized as Shahrīārī-ye ‘Olya; also known as Shahrīyārī) is a village in, and the capital of, Shahriari Rural District of Chahak District of Khatam County, Yazd province, Iran. At the 2006 National Census, its population was 575 in 132 households, when it was in Chahak Rural District. The following census in 2011 counted 570 people in 154 households. The latest census in 2016 showed a population of 708 people in 192 households. After the census, Chahak Rural District was elevated to the status of a district and divided into two rural districts, with Shahriari-ye Olya as the capital of newly formed Shahriari Rural District.

References 

Khatam County

Populated places in Yazd Province

Populated places in Khatam County